The 1968–69 European Cup Winners' Cup was the ninth season of the European Cup Winners' Cup, a club football competition organised by UEFA for the cup winners from each of its member associations. The tournament was won by Czechoslovakian side Slovan Bratislava, who beat Spanish club Barcelona 3–2 in the final in Basel, Switzerland. It was the first time a club from the Eastern Bloc won the title. A number of withdrawals by Eastern European clubs from the first round as a result of the Warsaw Pact invasion of Czechoslovakia led to several walkovers and byes that lasted into the second round.

First round

|}

The following clubs withdrew following UEFA's decision to separate western and Eastern countries due to troubles in Czechoslovakia:
FC Spartak (Sofia), Union Berlin, Górnik Zabrze, Dinamo Moscow, Raba Vasas ETO

1 The match was played in Thessaloniki.

2 The match was played in Esch.

Source:

Second round

|}

Source:

First leg

Second leg

West Bromwich Albion won 5–1 on aggregate.

Quarter-finals

|}

1 The match was played in Barcelona.

Source:

First leg

Second leg

Slovan Bratislava won 3–1 on aggregate.

Semi-finals 

|}
Source:

Final

References

3
UEFA Cup Winners' Cup seasons